Vhembe is one of the 5 districts of Limpopo province of South Africa. It is the northernmost district of the country and shares its northern border with Beitbridge district in  Zimbabwe and on the east with Gaza Province in Mozambique. Vhembe consist of all territories that were part of the former Venda Bantustan, however, two large densely populated districts of the former Tsonga homeland of Gazankulu, in particular, Hlanganani and Malamulele were also incorporated into Vhembe, hence the ethnic diversity of the District. The seat of Vhembe is Thohoyandou, the capital of the former Venda Bantustan. According to 2011 census, the majority of Vhembe residents, about 800,000, speak TshiVenda as their mother language, while 400,000 speak Xitsonga as their home language. However, the Tsonga people are in majority south of Levubu River and they constitute more than 85% of the population in the south of the historic river Levubu, while the Venda are the minority south of Levubu, at 15%. The Northern Sotho speakers number 27,000.  The district code is DC34.

History
Vhembe is settled by the Venda people who constitute the majority of the population of Vhembe. Later, from around 1820 onwards, the Tsonga people started to invade from the south east and are today a majority in the whole southern and eastern part of Vhembe, which are known today as Malamulele (in the east of Vhembe) and Hlanganani (in the south of Vhembe). At the same time, the Boer Voortrekkers arrived in Vhembe, at around 1836. Venda communities are only found in Vhembe district and as a result, there are no existing Venda communities or villages outside the district. Vhembe means Limpopo river in the Venda language. Before the renaming of Limpopo Province in 2002, the name Vhembe was submitted to the Limpopo legislature as one of the desired name for the new Province but the majority of the members of the Legislature voted against the name Vhembe in favour of the name Limpopo. The Dzata ruins in Thulamela Local Municipality once served as the main settlement and capital of the Venda empire which had dominated the area during the 18th century.

Boer settlement of the territory began in the late 18th century and gradually upsurged throughout the 19th century. By the turn of the century, the Soutpansberg was taken by the Boers from the Venda rulers, making it one of the last areas in the future republic of South Africa to come under white rule. During the apartheid era, the bantustan of Venda (declared independent in 1979) was established in the eastern part of the Vhembe area, and was reintegrated into the country in 1994. The former bantustan capital, Thohoyandou (named after a chief that had led the expansion of the Venda empire in the 18th century) is the current seat of the Vhembe district.

On December 11, 2008, Vhembe was declared a disaster zone by the Limpopo government due to the spread of cholera from across the Zimbabwean border to the district.

The Vhembe region became the Vhembe Biosphere Reserve in 2009, which was officially declared  a biosphere reserve in 2011. The reserve includes the Blouberg Range, the Kruger National Park, the Philip Herd Nature Reserve, the Nwanedi Nature Reserve, the Makgabeng Plateau, the Makuleke Wetlands, the Mapungubwe Cultural Landscape and the Soutpansberg.

Geography
The main geographical feature of the district is the Soutpansberg mountains.

Neighbours
Vhembe is surrounded by:
 Mozambique to the east
 Zimbabwe to the north
 Botswana to the north-west
 Mopani (DC33) to the south
 Capricorn (DC35) to the south-west

Local municipalities
The district contains the following local municipalities:

Demographics
The following statistics are from the census 2011 10% sample.

Gender

Population group

Age

Politics

Election results
Election results for Vhembe in the South African general election, 2004. 
 Population 18 and over: 621 522 [51.80% of total population]
 Total votes: 386 629 [32.22% of total population]
 Voting % estimate: 62.21% votes as a % of population 18 and over

References

External links
 Vhembe District Municipality Official Website
 Vhembe Region named UNESCO’s Biosphere Reserve
https://www.vhembebiosphere.org/visit-vhembe
https://www.herdreserve.co.za/

District municipalities of Limpopo
Vhembe District Municipality